The Hong Kong Federation of Students (HKFS,  or 學聯) is a student organisation founded in May 1958 by the student unions of four higher education institutions in Hong Kong. The inaugural committee had seven members representing the four schools. The purpose of the HKFS is to promote student movements and to enhance the student body's engagement in society. Since the 1990s, the federation has taken an interest in daily events in Hong Kong, and no longer restricts itself to the areas of education and politics.
The HKFS council is convened by  representatives of the university student unions. The representatives are elected by the university students. A standing committee is appointed by the council.

1970s

In 1971, the Senkaku Islands dispute arose. The administration of the Senkaku/Diaoyutai Islands was transferred from the United States to Japan. On 14 February 1971, Hong Kong students established the Hong Kong Action Committee in Defence of the Diaoyutai Islands. The Action Committee held demonstrations in front of the Japanese consulate in Hong Kong. Twenty-one people were arrested, seven of whom were university students. On 17 April, the Hong Kong University Students' Union held a peaceful demonstration involving about 1000 students. On 7 July, the HKFS held a demonstration on a larger scale. In 1971, the HKFS was an illegal organisation and some students were arrested by the Royal Hong Kong Police. On 13 May 1975, the federation held its last protest over the issue.

During 1975 and 1976, the standing committee of the HKFS voiced its support for the Cultural Revolution in mainland China. The committee criticised Mak Chung Man, who led students to protest against the communists and said he was "against all the Chinese". Students resented this statement and the issue became the main topic of debate during the HKFS elections of 1976.

In April 1977, the Hong Kong University Students' Union suggested the removal of the words "anti-right wing" from the action guide of the HKFS but the standing committee refused to vote. All delegates from the Hong Kong University Students' Union withdrew from the HKFS in protest.

In April 1979, the HKFS commemorated the May Fourth Movement. The event was poorly attended.

1980s and 1990s

During the 1980s, the HKFS began to support democracy in Taiwan and mainland China. In 1981, the Hong Kong Standard revealed that the HKFS had been placed on a "Red List" in a classified Standing Committee on Pressure Groups (SCOPG) report for being "pro-communist". In March 1983, the HKFS reported the Shue Yan College to the Hong Kong Independent Commission against Corruption but no prosecution was launched. After 1984, the HKFS changed from supporting communism to fully supporting democratic development.

In February 1989, about 4000 students boycotted their classes to protest against the policy of the Hong Kong Education Department. During the Tiananmen Square protests of 1989, the HKFS took part in China-wide demonstrations and strikes. On 20 May, when the tropical cyclone signal number 8 was hoisted, thousands of students took part in a massive demonstration. After the 4 June massacre, all of the HKFS represented university students stopped attending classes. In 1991, there were protests (said by police to be illegal) to support the dissident, Wang Dan.

2000s
In 2003, 2004 and 2005, the HKFS took an active part in the 1 July marches.

2010s

In 2014, the HKFS, led by Alex Chow and Lester Shum, was a participating organisation in the Umbrella Movement. The movement demanded genuine democracy in future chief executive elections. Admiralty, Causeway Bay and Mong Kok were occupied by suffragists for two months.

Some democratic activists criticised the HKFS for failing to lead the movement. In early 2015, five of the member organisations held disaffiliation referendums. Four passed, reducing the number of member organisations from eight to four. The results are as follows:

Amidst this push for localism in Hong Kong, the HKFS was, for the first time, absent from the Victoria Park candlelight vigil commemorating the 1989 Tiananmen Massacre.

Members
The Hong Kong Federation of Students is formed by the student unions of four institutions:
 Chinese University Students' Union
 Lingnan University Students' Union
 Hong Kong Shue Yan University Students' Union
 Hong Kong University of Science and Technology Students' Union

Former members were:
 Hong Kong University Students' Union
 Hong Kong Baptist University Students' Union
 City University Students' Union
 Hong Kong Polytechnic University Students' Union

References

External links

 Official Website

 
1958 establishments in Hong Kong
Politics of Hong Kong
Student organizations established in 1958
Students' unions in Hong Kong